Lekharka is a village development committee in Bhojpur District in the Kosi Zone of eastern Nepal. According to the 1991 Nepal census it had a population of 2885 people living in 509 individual households.

References

External links
UN map of the municipalities of Bhojpur District

Populated places in Bhojpur District, Nepal